Gaurav Khanna is an Indian-American black hole physicist, supercomputing innovator, academic and researcher. He is a Professor of Physics, and the founding Director of Research Computing and the Center for Computational Research at University of Rhode Island.

Khanna has authored 100 publications. His work is focused in the areas of gravitational physics, computational physics, black holes, and quantum gravity. He has also made contributions in the area of black hole perturbation theory, loop quantum cosmology, singularities and gravitational wave science. He is the creator of the OpenMacGrid, PlayStation 3 Gravity Grid, and developer of open-source software for scientific computing for the Mac. His work has been featured multiple times in newspapers and blogs, including The New York Times, HPCWire, Physics Buzz, The Verge, Forbes, Wired, among others. He was named a Fellow of the American Physical Society in 2021.

Khanna served as a guest editor for a 2018 special issue of IEEE CiSE with a focus on supercomputing.

Education
Khanna studied at Indian Institute of Technology, Kanpur and completed his B. Tech degree in Electrical Engineering in 1995. He then moved to United States and earned his Ph. D. degree in Physics from Pennsylvania State University in 2000.

Career
Beginning in September 2000, he held appointment as an Assistant Professor of Mathematics at Long Island University Southampton. He was then appointed by University of Massachusetts Dartmouth in 2003 as an Assistant Professor of Physics. He was promoted to Associate Professor in 2009, and to Full Professor of Physics in 2015. He is currently a Professor of Physics, and Director of Research Computing at the University of Rhode Island. He is the founding Director of Research Computing and the Center for Computational Research at the university.

His career choices were heavily influenced by his father, Dr. Mohinder P. Khanna, a well-known theoretical particle physicist in Panjab University, India.

Research
Khanna's work is focused in the areas of gravitational physics, computational physics, black holes, and quantum gravity. He has also worked on black hole perturbation theory, loop quantum cosmology, singularities and gravitational wave science.

Black Hole Models Related to Gravitational Waves
Khanna is well-known for his research on late-time radiative "tails" in black hole spacetimes, also called "Price tails" named after Richard H. Price. With research collaborators, he was the first to discover the equivalent Price tails formula in the context of (astrophysical, i.e. rotating) Kerr black holes. This formula was later placed on a rigorous mathematical foundation by Aretakis and others.

In another work, Khanna has introduced a reduced-order surrogate model called "EMRISur1dq1e4" for gravitational waveforms. He trained this model on the basis of waveform data generated by point-particle black hole perturbation theory (ppBHPT), and evaluated its applicability for large-mass-ratio and comparable mass-ratio binaries finding that it was unreasonably effective. In his paper published in 2016, he solved the inhomogeneous Teukolsky equation, and focused linearized gravitational waves emitted from a plunge into a nearly extremal Kerr black hole.

Khanna has also studied black hole binaries, and demonstrated that coalescence of two black holes generates gravitational waves that provide information regarding the properties of those black holes and their binary configuration. He further described the ringdown form of final coalescence cycles as a superposition of quasinormal modes in context of the merged remnant black hole.

Scientific Computing
In his study regarding scientific computation, Khanna introduced a strategy to scale complex hybrid systems, and also discussed a prototype tool which was built over the theorem prover PVS. He also presented techniques that generate information in context of nonlinear dynamical systems, and discussed their applications in terms of automation for polynomial systems using algorithms from computational algebraic geometry. Furthermore, he suggested the application of formal qualitative abstraction approach in terms of nonlinear systems.

Khanna also studied time-domain methods, and proposed their applications in computing gravitational waveforms and fluxes from extreme mass-ratio inspirals. He further explained the computation of low-m modes using the frequency-domain approach, and computation of high-m modes using the time-domain approach.

In the area of scientific computing he is perhaps best known for his innovative work on low-cost supercomputing, making it more accessible to lesser-resourced universities and countries.

Singularities in Classical and Quantum Black Holes
While studying singularities, Khanna highlighted the work of Jacobson and Sotiriou in the context of rotating black holes, and then described that if radiative effects can be neglected for the trajectories, that gives rise to naked singularities. He also discussed the significance of the conservative self-force in context of these orbits. He also introduced a class of loop quantizations in terms of anisotropic models including the black hole interior, and studied the refinement process of lattice in context of dynamical changes of the volume.

Khanna published a paper focused on the numerical study of Marolf-Ori singularity inside fast spinning black holes in terms of scalar field or vacuum gravitational perturbations. He also studied how Cauchy horizon singularity inside perturbed Kerr black holes develops an instability that leads to its transformation into a curvature singularity.

Extremal Black Holes and Mathematical Relativity
Khanna conducted a study in 2019 focused the transient scalar hair, and described the behavior of this nearly extreme black hole hair along with its measurement at future null infinity as a transient phenomenon. Furthermore, he studied about the stability of extreme black holes against linearized gravitational perturbations, and argued that the divergence of ψ4 is a consequence of the choice of a fixed tetrad.

His most recent work on gravitational hair in the context of extremal black holes received significant attention in the community and popular media.

Awards and honors
2021–present - Fellow of the American Physical Society (APS): For pioneering work in computational relativity, including innovative supercomputing techniques, computations of gravitational perturbations of black holes, gravitational waveforms from extreme mass-ratio binaries, classical black hole physics, and quantum gravity.
2021-2022 - Board member at OSHEAN.org
2011-2013 - Distinguished Scientist at HPC Research Inc.
2008–present - Member of the Foundational Questions Institute
1997-1998 - Teaching Award, The Pennsylvania State University
1995-2000 - Braddock, Duncan, Roberts, T. Das Fellowships, The Pennsylvania State University

Bibliography
Tiwari, A., & Khanna, G. (2002, March). Series of abstractions for hybrid automata. In International Workshop on Hybrid Systems: Computation and Control (pp. 465–478). Springer, Berlin, Heidelberg.
Tiwari, A., & Khanna, G. (2004, March). Nonlinear systems: Approximating reach sets. In International Workshop on Hybrid Systems: Computation and Control (pp. 600–614). Springer, Berlin, Heidelberg.
Bojowald, M., Cartin, D., & Khanna, G. (2007). Lattice refining loop quantum cosmology, anisotropic models, and stability. Physical Review D, 76(6), 064018.
Barausse, E., Cardoso, V., & Khanna, G. (2010). Test bodies and naked singularities: is the self-force the cosmic censor?. Physical review letters, 105(26), 261102.
Barausse, E., Cardoso, V., & Khanna, G. (2011). Testing the Cosmic Censorship Conjecture with point particles: the effect of radiation reaction and the self-force. Physical Review D, 84(10), 104006.

A more complete list is available on Khanna's Google Scholar page.

Personal
Khanna has lived in Dartmouth, MA and also in Rhode Island with his wife, April and two daughters Sarah and Rachel.

References

Living people
Year of birth missing (living people)
Indian American
American physicists
IIT Kanpur alumni
Pennsylvania State University alumni
University of Rhode Island faculty
University of Massachusetts Dartmouth faculty
Fellows of the American Physical Society